A piranha, or piraña, is a carnivorous freshwater fish.

Film 
Piranha (1978 film), 1978 horror film
Piranha II: The Spawning, 1981 sequel to the 1978 film
Piranha (1995 film), 1995 remake of the 1978 film
Piranha 3D, 2010 remake of the 1978 film
Piranha 3DD, 2012 sequel to the 2010 film
 Piranha (film series), a horror comedy franchise
Piranha (1972 film), horror film unrelated to the film series
Piranha (2006 film), Russian film
Piranhas (2019 film), a 2019 Italian film

Music 
The Piranhas, a British ska-influenced punk band
Piranha (album), 2000 album by the Fullerton College Jazz Band
"Piranha" (song), by The Grace from their album Graceful 4
"Piranha", song by The Prodigy from the album Invaders Must Die
"PirANhA", song by rock band Tripping Daisy from the album I Am an Elastic Firecracker
"Piranha", song by metal band Exodus from the album Bonded by Blood

Publications 
The Piranha, Trinity College, Dublin's student satirical newspaper
Piranha Press, imprint of DC comics (1989 to 1993)
Piranha Brothers, a Monty Python sketch
Piranha Club, powerful and eponymous fraternity in the comic strip Ernie/Piranha Club

Software and video games 
 Piranha (software), a data mining system
 Piranha Bytes, a German game developer 
 Piranha Interactive Publishing, an American software publisher
 Piranha Games, a Canadian software developer
 Piranha Software, a defunct software label of Macmillan Publishing
 Petey Piranha, a character in Nintendo's Mario game series

Military 
ALR Piranha, an aircraft project undertaken by the Swiss Air Force
MAA-1 Piranha, a Brazilian air-to-air missile
Mowag Piranha, a type of armoured fighting vehicle
USS Piranha (SS-389), a Balao-class submarine

Other uses 
 Piranhas (baseball), a nickname for some of the hitters on the Minnesota Twins baseball team
 Pirana, Rajasthan, a village in India
 Bertone Pirana, a show car based on the Jaguar E-Type
 Piranha solution, a cleaning solution
 Piraña (Efteling), a river rapids ride in amusement park Efteling
 Piranha (comics), a fictional character appearing in Marvel Comics
 Piranha (compositing software), a digital imaging application
 Piranhas, Alagoas, Brazil
 Piranhas, Goiás, Brazil

See also 
 Paraná (disambiguation)
 Piraha (disambiguation)